Abbubaker Mobara (born 18 February 1994) is a South African soccer player who plays as a defender and midfielder for AmaZulu F.C. in the Premier Soccer League.
He can play as right back, centre back and defensive midfielder.

Early life
Mobara, who hails from Mitchells Plain on the Cape Flats, started playing soccer at his school and was spotted by Ajax Cape Town scouts after scoring for his local club against them in a cup final.

Early career
Mobara previously underwent trials with FC Twente, FC Porto, and RC Lens before returning to Ajax Cape Town. Mobara also spent time with AFC Ajax but was not signed.

International career
He has caps at U17, U18 and U20 levels for South Africa.

Honours

Individual
  2016–17 Nedbank Cup player of the tournament

Club
Ajax Cape Town
 MTN 8: 2015

National
Bafana Bafana
 Cosafa cup: 2016

References

External links
 ‘Player prolie’
 
 
 

1994 births
Living people
Soccer players from Cape Town
Cape Town Spurs F.C. players
Orlando Pirates F.C. players
Cape Town City F.C. (2016) players
South African Premier Division players
South African soccer players
Association football midfielders
Association football defenders
Cape Coloureds
2015 Africa U-23 Cup of Nations players
Footballers at the 2016 Summer Olympics
Olympic soccer players of South Africa
South Africa international soccer players